Krippendorf's Tribe is a 1998 American comedy film directed by Todd Holland and based on Frank Parkin's 1985 novel of the same name. The film stars Richard Dreyfuss, Jenna Elfman, Natasha Lyonne, and Lily Tomlin. Its plot follows Professor James Krippendorf (Dreyfuss), an anthropologist who, with the help of his three children, creates a fictitious lost New Guinea tribe to cover up his misuse of grant money.

Krippendorf's Tribe was produced by Touchstone Pictures and distributed by Buena Vista Pictures, the former a label of and the latter a subsidiary of The Walt Disney Company. The film received generally negative reviews, with criticism for its racial stereotypes.

Plot
Respected anthropologist James Krippendorf and his wife, Jennifer, bring their three children along during their much-enjoyed search in New Guinea for a lost tribe. The search fails, despite the family's best efforts. After Jennifer's death back in the U.S., James falls into academic stagnation, having spent all his foundation grant money raising the children as a single parent. Scheduled to lecture at a college and fearful of being charged with misuse of grant funds, James concocts an imaginary tribe, the Shelmikedmu, using the names of his children as a basis. He later fakes a 16 mm "documentary" film, casting his children as tribe members and superimposing footage of a legitimate New Guinean tribe so as to enhance the illusion.

Anthropologist Veronica Micelli contacts cable-TV producer Henry Spivey, forcing James to continue creating fraudulent footage as James' rival Ruth Allen becomes suspicious. Because he has described a culture unlike any other, Krippendorf's fraud becomes increasingly famous. James himself masquerades as a tribal elder, while his two sons, Mickey and Edmund, create and enact increasingly imaginative rituals. Only the eldest child, James' daughter Shelly, refuses to participate due to her disgust at the dishonesty perpetrated by her father.

Taking advantage of her curiosity, James tricks Veronica into participating in his false documentary. When she discovers the truth, she is initially angry, but later helps James continue his fraud. Ruth Allen travels to New Guinea, discovering no tribe in the location specified by James. She transmits the news via fax to a colleague, who exposes James at a gala. James' imaginative son, Mickey, improvises a lie, that the Shelmikedmu hide by means of a magical ritual known only to them.

Unknown to the majority of the characters, Shelly has contacted the New Guineans befriended by her family during the futile search for the lost tribe, urging them to masquerade as the Shelmikedmu in order to disappoint Ruth Allen. The ruse succeeds, and the accusation of fraud is abandoned. James, relieved of his worries, ends his fraud. Because Veronica has become sexually involved with him during her participation in his deceit, she assumes the role of a mother toward the children, though she is not explicitly said to marry James.

Cast
 Richard Dreyfuss as Professor James Krippendorf
 Jenna Elfman as Professor Veronica Micelli
 Natasha Lyonne as Shelly Krippendorf
 Lily Tomlin as Professor Ruth Allen
 Barbara Williams as Professor Jennifer Harding Krippendorf
 Gregory Smith as Michael "Mickey" Krippendorf
 Carl Michael Lindner as Edmund Krippendorf
 Stephen Root as Gerald Adams
 Zakes Mokae as Sulukim
 Mila Kunis as Abbey Tournquist
 David Ogden Stiers as Henry Spivey
 Doris Belack as President Porter
 Frances Bay as Edith Proxmire 
 Sandy Martin as Nurse

Reception

Box office
Krippendorf's Tribe opened at #7 in its opening weekend with $3,316,377. By the end of its domestic run, the film grossed $7,571,115.

Critical response
The film received generally negative reviews. On Rotten Tomatoes, the film has an approval rating of 18% based on reviews from 39 critics, with an average rating of 4.2/10.

Roger Ebert of the Chicago Sun-Times gave the film a score of two out of four stars, writing: "Is it possible to recommend a whole comedy on the basis of one scene that made you laugh almost uncontrollably? I fear not. And yet Krippendorf's Tribe has such a scene, and many comedies have none." Kevin Thomas of the Los Angeles Times wrote that the film "revives all those old demeaning racist stereotypes in the most horrible ways," and that it "isn't remotely intelligent or sophisticated enough to make it as a pitch-dark comedy or satire", calling it "arguably the worst movie ever to come out of Disney".

References

External links
 
 
 

1998 films
1998 comedy films
American comedy films
Films based on British novels
Films set in 1997
Films shot in California
Films shot in Hawaii
American mockumentary films
Touchstone Pictures films
Films scored by Bruce Broughton
1990s English-language films
Films directed by Todd Holland
1990s American films